French honorifics are based on the wide use of Madame for women and Monsieur for men.

Social
 "Monsieur" (M.) for a man, The plural is Messieurs (MM. for short).
 "Madame" (Mme) for a woman. The plural is Mesdames (Mmes).
 "Mademoiselle" (Mlle) is a traditional alternative for an unmarried woman. The plural is Mesdemoiselles (Mlles).

Usage of "Mademoiselle" varies based on regions and ideology. In Canada and Switzerland, public administrations have been banned from using this title for a long time. France has taken this step in 2012. In Belgium, its use is not recommended, but not forbidden either.

In France, calling a young woman "Mademoiselle" is usually considered more polite, and calling a middle-aged woman "Mademoiselle" can be a way to tell her that she looks like she is in her twenties and may therefore be considered flattering. In Canada, on the other hand, this usage may be considered offensive or out of fashion.

Professional
 Docteur" (Dr) is used for medical practitioners whereas "Professeur"  is used for professors and teachers. The holders of a doctorate other than medical are generally not referred to as Docteurs, though they have the legal right to use the title; Professors in academia used the style Monsieur le Professeur rather than the honorific plain Professeur.
 "Maître" (Me) is used for law professions (solicitors, notaries), whereas 
 Judges are called "Monsieur le Président" or "Madame la Présidente" ("Madame le Président" is sometimes preferred in France) if they preside a court of justice, or "Monsieur le Juge" and "Madame la Juge"  ("Madame le Juge" is sometimes preferred in France and in Canada) otherwise.

Any other honorific is usually created by using "Monsieur" or "Madame" and then adding a title. For instance, "Monsieur le Président" or "Monsieur le Ministre".

Religious
Catholic clergy use several specific honorifics.
 Son Eminence / Monsieur le Cardinal : Cardinals.
 Son Excellence / Monseigneur : Bishops, archbishops.
 Monsieur l'Abbé / Mon Père : priests.
 Dom / Mon Père/Frère : for Benedictine monks.
 Le Révérend Père / Mon Père : abbots and some other regular clergy.
 Frère / Mon Frère : regular clergy unless style with Père (the usage changes a lot according to orders and congregations).
 La Révérende Mère / Ma Mère : abbesses.
 Sœur / Ma Sœur : nuns.

The clergy of other faiths use the honorifics Monsieur le … or Madame la …, such as Monsieur le rabbin or Monsieur l'imam.

Nobility and royalty
Kings of France used the honorific Sire, princes Monseigneur. Queens and princesses were plain Madame.

Nobles of the rank of duke used Monsieur le duc/Madame la duchesse, non-royal princes used Prince/Princesse (without the Monsieur/Madame), other noblemen plain Monsieur and Madame. Only servants ever addressed their employer as Monsieur le comte or Madame la baronne.

See also

German honorifics
Chinese honorifics
Korean honorifics
Japanese honorifics

References

Honorifics by country
Honorifics by language